Haydn Rigby (born 18 December 1936) is an English former backstroke swimmer.

Swimming career
Rigby represented Great Britain at two consecutive Summer Olympics, starting in 1956.

He represented England at the 1954 British Empire and Commonwealth Games in Vancouver, Canada and the 1958 British Empire and Commonwealth Games in Cardiff, Wales.

Born in Southport, Merseyside, England, started Wigan Wasps Swimming Team and coached at the Wigan International Swimming Pool. Hayden taught many of the national champions and international swimmers from the 1990s how to swim and is still very much involved in the sport of swimming. He continues to coach youngsters at Wigan Swimming Club Wasps and also coaches the younger groups training in the Wigan best swimming squad.

References

External links
 Sports Profile
 Wigan Swimming Club

1936 births
Living people
Swimmers at the 1956 Summer Olympics
Swimmers at the 1960 Summer Olympics
Olympic swimmers of Great Britain
Sportspeople from Wigan
English backstroke swimmers
Swimmers at the 1954 British Empire and Commonwealth Games
Sportspeople from Southport
English male swimmers
Commonwealth Games competitors for England